King's University may refer to :

 King's University College (University of Western Ontario), a Roman Catholic college located in London, Ontario, Canada
 The King's University (Edmonton) – formerly King's University College in Edmonton, Alberta, Canada
 The King's University (Texas) – formerly The King's College and Seminary in Los Angeles, California
King's University, Dublin, Ireland, a fictional Irish university also known as King's College Dublin
 Kings University - A private university in Odeomu area of Osun State, Nigeria.

See also
 King's College (disambiguation)
 King's University College (disambiguation)